The first USS Cabot of the United States was a 14-gun brig, one of the first ships of the Continental Navy, and the first to be captured in the American Revolutionary War in the Battle off Yarmouth (1777).

On 13 October 1775, acting on intelligence received concerning the dispatch of supply vessels from Britain, the Continental Congress authorized the acquisition of two ships and the appointment of a three man Naval Committee to oversee their acquisition and fitting out. At that time, one vessel was specified as being of 10 guns while the other was not of a specified size. On 30 October 1775, The issue was again revisited by Congress and the second vessel was specified as being of 14 guns while two more, larger vessels were authorized.  Even though the first vessel was specified as 10 guns, the footnotes in for the entry on the 30th from the compilation known as "Naval Documents of the American Revolution" specifies the first authorization as being the Cabot while the second is the Andrew Doria (1775 brig). The newly authorized ships are identified as the USS Columbus (1774) and the USS Alfred (1774).

The brig Cabot was purchased in Philadelphia, Pennsylvania, during November 1775, outfitted there by Wharton and Humphreys, and placed under the command of Captain J. B. Hopkins.

Sailing with Commodore Esek Hopkins' fleet, Cabot joined in the expedition against the Bahamas in March 1776, taking part in the amphibious operations against New Providence on 3 March. By this bold stroke, men of the fleet seized large quantities of desperately needed military supplies which they carried back to the Continental Army. Upon the return of the fleet north, Cabot was first to fire in the engagement with HMS Glasgow on 6 April. The next month, she made a short cruise off the New England coast, during which she took her first prize. In September and October, again sailing in New England waters, she seized six more prizes.

Under the command of Captain Joseph Olney, Cabot stood out of Boston weeks before on 28 March 1777 the vessel (140 men) encountered HMS Milford (32), under the command of Captain John Burr, in the Battle off Yarmouth (1777). The vastly more powerful British ship chased Cabot and forced her ashore near the mouth of the Chebogue, Nova Scotia.   While Cabot's captain and crew escaped into the woods unharmed, the British were later able to get the brig off, and refitted her for service in the Royal Navy.

She stands out as the first American armed vessel to engage an enemy. According to Brigadier General Edwin H. Simmons' research, the act was initiated by a Continental Marine in the tops of the Cabot throwing a hand grenade at the feet of the British officer, who at that point was still waiting for a reply from the American vessel.

Sources

Ships of the Continental Navy
1770s ships
Brigs of the United States Navy